"The Rains of Castamere" is the ninth and penultimate episode of the third season of HBO's medieval fantasy television series Game of Thrones, and the 29th episode of the series. The episode was written by executive producers David Benioff and D. B. Weiss, and directed by David Nutter.

The episode is centered on the wedding of Edmure Tully and Roslin Frey, one of the most memorable events of the book series, commonly called "The Red Wedding", during which Robb Stark and his banner-men are massacred. Other storylines include Bran Stark's group's having to separate, Jon Snow's loyalties being tested, and Daenerys Targaryen's plotting her invasion of the city of Yunkai. The title is a song belonging to the Lannister family, whose lyrics foreshadow the Red Wedding and which is played by the band at the wedding right before the slaughter begins.

"The Rains of Castamere" is widely regarded as one of the most harrowing episodes of television in history. It earned Benioff and Weiss a nomination for Primetime Emmy Award for Outstanding Writing for a Drama Series, and was the recipient of the Hugo Award for Best Dramatic Presentation, Short Form. This episode marks the final appearance of Richard Madden (Robb Stark), Oona Chaplin (Talisa Stark), and Michelle Fairley (Catelyn Stark).

Plot

Beyond the Wall
Sam and Gilly continue their march south. Sam tells Gilly he plans for them to cross the Wall using the entrance at the Nightfort, an abandoned castle to the west of Castle Black.

In the North
Bran and his group take shelter in an abandoned mill. They see an old horse breeder captured by Jon's wildling group. Hodor, scared of thunderstorms, begins yelling, which threatens to give away their location. Bran accidentally uses his warg abilities to enter Hodor's mind and subdue him. Orell tells Jon to kill the old man to prove his loyalty, but when he hesitates, Ygritte kills him instead. Tormund realizes that Jon is not loyal to them and orders his men to kill him. Bran enters Summer's mind and helps Jon to defeat Tormund's men and Orell. Jon escapes, leaving behind a saddened Ygritte. With dangers ahead, Bran asks Osha and Rickon to leave for Last Hearth, the home of the Umber family.

In Yunkai
Daario, Jorah, and Grey Worm enter the city and fight some slave guards. The other slaves refuse to fight and Daenerys is soon in control of the city.

At the Twins
The Stark army arrive at the Twins. Robb apologizes to Walder Frey and his daughters for not keeping his promised betrothal. After Edmure marries Roslin, Frey calls for the bedding ceremony and the couple are taken away. Talisa tells Robb that she wants to name their son Eddard. The doors to the hall are then locked and a Lannister song, "The Rains of Castamere", begins to play, and Catelyn realizes that they have been betrayed by Roose Bolton. The Freys attack, killing many of the Starks, including Talisa. Sandor Clegane, travelling to the Twins with Arya Stark, steals a cart of food. That night, they arrive and, despite being turned away by the guards, Arya sneaks in. She witnesses the killing of the Stark soldiers and Robb's direwolf before being recaptured by Sandor. Catelyn threatens to kill Walder's wife, Joyeuse, if he does not let Robb leave alive, but Walder is indifferent to the threat. Robb is stabbed and killed by Roose while Catelyn watches in horror. After cutting Joyeuse's throat, Catelyn's own throat is cut by Black Walder Frey.

Production

Writing
"The Rains of Castamere" was written by executive producers David Benioff and D. B. Weiss, based on George R. R. Martin's original work from his novel A Storm of Swords. The episode adapts content from chapters 41 to 43 and 50 to 53 (Bran III, Jon V, Daenerys IV, Catelyn VI, Arya X, Catelyn VII, and Arya XI).

The episode includes one of the most important plot turns of the series: the betrayal and assassination of the Stark forces during a marriage ceremony in what came to be known as "The Red Wedding". The event culminates in Roose Bolton delivering Jaime Lannister's message from "The Bear and the Maiden Fair", before killing Robb. This tragic turn of events had a profound impact on Benioff and Weiss in their first read of the novels and it was the scene that convinced them to attempt to obtain the rights for a television series.

George R. R. Martin conceived The Red Wedding during the earliest stages of the planning of his saga, when he was envisioning a trilogy with The Red Wedding as one of the climactic events at the end of the first of the three books. Martin was particularly inspired by two events in Scottish history. One of them was the 15th century historical event known as the "Black Dinner", where the Scottish king invited the chieftains of the powerful Clan Douglas to a feast at Edinburgh Castle. A black bull's head, the symbol of death, was served as the last course of the dinner while a single drum was playing in the background, and the Douglases were murdered. Another event from which the author drew inspiration was the 1692 Massacre of Glencoe, where Clan MacDonald hosted the Campbell Clan who killed thirty-eight of their hosts overnight.

Martin has said The Red Wedding was the hardest thing he has ever written. He explained that he always tries to put himself in the skin of his characters when writing from their perspective, and develops bonds with them. He even felt attached to the minor characters killed during the massacre. It was so painful for him that he skipped the chapter and continued writing, and only when the rest of the book was finished, he "forced himself" to come back to the dreaded scene. In 2012, at ComicCon he even joked that "he will visit a country with no television when the episode goes on air".

Martin also said he killed off Robb because he believed the audience would assume that the story was about Ned Stark's heir avenging his death and wished to keep them guessing. Richard Madden suggested Talisa — whose counterpart Jeyne Westerling was not killed in the books — died so Robb's heir could not avenge his death.

Casting
Will Champion, the drummer and backing vocalist of the band Coldplay, has a cameo appearance as one of the musicians who play at the wedding.

Reception

Ratings
"The Rains of Castamere" premiered to 5.22 million viewers and received a 2.8 rating in adults 18–49. The second airing was viewed by 1.08 million people, bringing total viewership for the night to 6.30 million. In the United Kingdom, the episode was viewed by 1.013 million viewers, making it the highest-rated broadcast that week. It also received 0.112 million timeshift viewers.

Critical reception

The episode received universal acclaim by critics and is cited as one of the best of the series. Rotten Tomatoes, a prominent review aggregator, surveyed 39 reviews of the installment and judged 100% of them to be positive with an average score of 9.94 out of 10. The website's critical consensus reads, "The most unforgettable episode of Game of Thrones thus far, 'The Rains of Castamere' (or as it shall forever be known, 'The Red Wedding') packs a dramatic wallop that feels as exquisitely shocking as it does ultimately inevitable." The majority of the comments were directed at the massacre at the end of the episode, where high praise was especially directed to Michelle Fairley's performance, leading to the disappointment of many critics when she was not nominated for the Primetime Emmy Award for Outstanding Supporting Actress in a Drama Series at the 65th Primetime Emmy Awards. IGN's Matt Fowler gave the episode a perfect 10/10, calling it "an exquisitely awful event that managed to out-do the unpredictable and horrifying death of Ned Stark back in Season 1". Fowler also said he believed that the episode's depiction of the Red Wedding was more powerful than its depiction in A Song of Ice and Fire.

Writing for The A.V. Club, both David Sims and Emily VanDerWerff gave the episode an "A" grade. Sims (writing for people who have not read the novels) expressed shock at the deaths of several main characters, writing, "I don’t think I’ve really processed what I just watched". VanDerWerff, who reviews the episodes for people who have read the novels, wrote "If [the reader] doesn’t terribly want to deal with the thought of the deaths of Catelyn and Robb, well, he or she can read that much more quickly. Or he or she can read that much more slowly if there’s a need to process the emotions more fully. On TV, you can't really do that." Reviewing for Forbes, Erik Kain called the episode "one of the best episodes of HBO's dark drama yet", and noted "there was a deeper sense of tragedy knowing [Robb] also lost his unborn child". Sean Collins of the Rolling Stone also praised the episode, and commented on the unusual step the show took in ending one of its central conflicts. Sarah Hughes of The Guardian highlighted the decision to kill Talisa, writing that her "heartbreaking end was unbearable".

“The Rains of Castamere“ is considered one of the most shocking and traumatic episodes in TV history. For its 65th anniversary, TV Guide picked "The Rains of Castamere" as the third best episode of the 21st century.

Viewer reception
The episode was also notable for the intense and emotional response it received from viewers, many of whom were unaware of what was about to transpire and had reaction videos filmed by people who had read the book on which it was based. This led to George R. R. Martin giving his personal analysis of the reactions, which he stated were on par with the responses he received from readers of A Storm of Swords. Madden said that he sobbed "very loudly" on an airplane flight right after filming the scene, and that he and Fairley were "both in tears" when they watched the episode.

Awards and nominations

See also
The death of Agamemnon, as told in the Odyssey.

References

External links

 "The Rains of Castamere" at HBO.com
 

2013 American television episodes
Game of Thrones (season 3) episodes
Fiction about regicide
Television episodes about mass murder
Television episodes about weddings
Television episodes directed by David Nutter
Television episodes written by David Benioff and D. B. Weiss